Phyllonorycter menaea is a moth of the family Gracillariidae. It is known from Pakistan.

References

menaea
Moths of Asia
Moths described in 1918